Naresh Gujral (born 19 May 1948) is a Chartered Accountant, Shiromani Akali Dal party politician and former a member of the Parliament of India representing Punjab in the Rajya Sabha, the upper house of the Indian Parliament.

Early life and background 
He is the son of Inder Kumar Gujral, former Prime Minister of India. He graduated from the University of Delhi.

Business career 
He started a clothing company "SPAN", because he had “nothing better to do”, as he put it.

Political career

References

External links
 Profile on Rajya Sabha website

Living people
Rajya Sabha members from Punjab, India
People from Jalandhar
Children of prime ministers of India
1948 births
Shiromani Akali Dal politicians